"Rise Up" is a song co-written and recorded by Swiss DJ and producer Yves Larock, featuring uncredited vocals by Jaba. It was released in May 2007 as the lead single from his then-upcoming debut album of the same title.  it remains his most successful single, having reached the top ten on many European countries' music charts. Since its release, "Rise Up" has become a major hit in clubs worldwide. Larock singled out India as a country he was particularly surprised to learn had  embraced the single.

Track listings
Digital download
 "Rise Up" (Radio Edit) – 2:51

CD Maxi Single
 "Rise Up" (Radio Edit) – 2:52
 "Rise Up" (Original Mix) – 7:35
 "Rise Up" (Vandalism Remix) – 6:34
 "Rise Up" (Harry 'Choo Choo' Romero Remix) – 9:35
 "Rise Up" (Raul Rincon Remix) – 7:49
 "Rise Up" (Club Мix) – 6:12
 "Rise Up" (Dub Mix) – 8:19

EP
 "Rise Up" (Raul Rincon Vox Mix) – 7:50 
 "Rise Up" (Harry Choo Choo Remix) – 9:33
 "Rise Up" (Vandalism Remix) – 6:33
 "Rise Up" (Lunatik Yves Remix) – 7:50
 "Rise Up" (Original Mix) – 7:34
 "Rise Up" (Club Mix) – 6:11
 "Rise Up" (Lunatik Yves Dub Mix) – 7:28
 "Rise Up" (Radio Edit) – 2:50
 "Rise Up" (Club Radio) – 3:22

Charts

Weekly charts

Year-end charts

Certifications

See also
List of Romanian Top 100 number ones

References

2007 singles
Number-one singles in Romania
Yves Larock songs
Number-one singles in Greece
2007 songs